Babygrande Records is an American independent record label based in New York City, founded by Chuck Wilson.  Babygrande is distributed by The Orchard and represented by the Creative Artists Agency in Hollywood.

History
Babygrande Records was founded in 2001. The label's catalog includes genres such as hip hop, indie rock, and EDM. Although distributed by Koch Records (now known as Entertainment One Music) for many years, Babygrande moved to the Orchard for distribution.

Artists currently on Babygrande Records (2020) 
 The Burn Unit
 Cap Gold
 Drako
 ERT
 Ghasper
 GZA
 Liam Tracy
 Lil' Scrappy
 Mercy
 The Original Jet Life Crew
 Skylab 3
 Theaftrparty
 The Yutes

Discography

The following is a discography for Babygrande Records, an independent record label based in New York City that specializes in Hip hop, Electronic, and Indie Rock.  Artists such as Havoc,  The Alchemist,  GZA, U-God, Freeway, Kasim Keto, Journalist 103, Brand Nubian, and Jedi Mind Tricks have released records on Babygrande Records.

Studio albums

Artists with releases on Babygrande Records

 7L & Esoteric
 9th Prince
 Agallah
 Almighty
 Apathy
 Army of the Pharaohs
 Big Shug
 Jet Life
 Blue Sky Black Death
 Brand Nubian
 Bronze Nazareth
 C-Rayz Walz
 Canibus
 Chief Kamachi
 Cilvaringz
 Custom Made
 Dame Grease
 Diamond D
 DK
 Doap Nixon
 Dreddy Kruger
 Fabio Musta
 Fred Money
 Freeway
 Gillie da Kid
 Grand Puba
 Group Home
 Hell Razah
 Hell Rell
 Hi-Tek
 Ice Water Inc.
 Immortal Technique
 J.R. Writer
 Jakki da Motamouth
 Jean Grae
 Jedi Mind Tricks 
 Journalist 103
 Jus Allah
 Kasim Keto
 King Syze
 Lawless Element
 Lee Bannon
 Lil Dap
 Lord Jamar
 M.O.P.
 Mountain Brothers
 N.O.R.E.
 NYOIL
 OuterSpace
 Pete Rock
 Polyrhythm Addicts
 Purple City Productions
 Purple City
 Raekwon
 Randam Luck
 Ransom
 Ras Kass
 Rocky Business
 Sa-Ra
 Shabazz the Disciple
 Sharkey 
 Skylab 3
 Smoke DZA
 Snowgoons
 Stoupe the Enemy of Mankind
 Supernatural 
 T.H.U.G. Angelz
 The Lost Children of Babylon
 The Society of Invisibles
 Tiye Phoenix
 U-God
 Wisemen

See also
 List of record labels

References

External links
 Official website

Hip hop record labels
Electronic music record labels
Indie rock record labels
Alternative rock record labels
American independent record labels
Record labels established in 2002
2002 establishments in New York City